Stuart Carroll  is professor of early modern history at the University of York. He won the J. Russell Major Prize of the American Historical Association in 2011 for the best French history book of the year for his Martyrs and Murderers: The Guise Family and the Making of Europe (2009).

Carroll did his BA at the University of Bristol and PhD at the University of London.

Selected publications
Martyrs and Murderers: The Guise Family and the Making of Europe. Oxford: Oxford University Press, 2009.
Cultures of Violence: Interpersonal Violence in Historical Perspective (editor). Palgrave Macmillan, 2007.
Blood and Violence in Early Modern France. Oxford: Oxford University Press, 2006.
Noble Power during the French Wars of Religion: the Guise Affinity and the Catholic Cause in Normandy. Cambridge: Cambridge University Press, 1998.

References

External links
Stuart Carroll on Homicide and the Civilizing Process.
Strata: Stuart Carroll.

Academics of the University of York
Living people
British historians
Alumni of the University of London
Alumni of the University of Bristol
Year of birth missing (living people)